1478 Vihuri, provisional designation , is a stony asteroid from the inner regions of the asteroid belt, approximately 9 kilometers in diameter. It was discovered on 6 February 1938, by Finnish Yrjö Väisälä at Turku Observatory in Southwest Finland. The asteroid was named after a Finnish philanthropist by the name of A. Vihuri.

Orbit and classification 

Vihuri orbits the Sun in the inner main-belt at a distance of 2.2–2.7 AU once every 3 years and 10 months (1,415 days). Its orbit has an eccentricity of 0.09 and an inclination of 8° with respect to the ecliptic.0 The asteroid's observation arc begins 11 days prior to its official discovery observation. A precovery taken at Lowell Observatory in 1906, as well as identification  made at Uccle in 1934, remained unused.

Physical characteristics

Rotation period 

In December 1983, a rotational lightcurve was obtained form photometric observations by American astronomer Richard P. Binzel. Analysis of the provisional lightcurve gave a rotation period of 19.5 hours with a brightness variation of 0.23 magnitude. As of 2017, no additional lightcurves of Vihuri have been obtained.

Diameter and albedo 

According to the surveys carried out by the Japanese Akari satellite and NASA's Wide-field Infrared Survey Explorer with its subsequent NEOWISE mission, Vihuri measures 9.52 and 11.19 kilometers in diameter, and its surface has an albedo of 0.126 and 0.127, respectively. The Collaborative Asteroid Lightcurve Link assumes a standard albedo for stony S-type asteroid of 0.20 and calculates a diameter of 8.45 kilometers with an absolute magnitude of 12.73.

Naming 

This minor planet was named for Finnish philanthropist A. Vihuri, a ship owner and supporter of science and arts. The official  was published by the Minor Planet Center on 15 July 1968.

References

External links 
 Asteroid Lightcurve Database (LCDB), query form (info )
 Dictionary of Minor Planet Names, Google books
 Asteroids and comets rotation curves, CdR – Observatoire de Genève, Raoul Behrend
 Discovery Circumstances: Numbered Minor Planets (1)-(5000) – Minor Planet Center
 
 

001478
Discoveries by Yrjö Väisälä
Named minor planets
19380206